John Carrick may refer to:

John de Carrick (died 1380), Scottish Chancellor and bishop
John Carrick (botanist) (1914–1978), botanist and author of plant names
John Carrick (Australian politician) (1918–2018)
John James Carrick (1873–1966), Canadian real estate promoter and political figure from Ontario
John Mulcaster Carrick (1833–1896), painter
John Donald Carrick (1787–1837), Scottish journalist and songwriter

See also
John Carik, a comic book character